Joseph Powell (June 23, 1828 – April 24, 1904) was a Democratic member of the U.S. House of Representatives from Pennsylvania.

Joseph Powell was born in Towanda, Pennsylvania. He completed preparatory studies and engaged in mercantile pursuits. He was president of the First National Bank of Towanda from 1870 to 1889.

Powell was elected as a Democrat to the Forty-fourth Congress. He was an unsuccessful candidate for reelection in 1876.

He was appointed special deputy collector of the port of Philadelphia in 1885 and served four years. He was sheriff of Bradford County, Pennsylvania, from 1889 to 1893. He died in Towanda in 1904, and was interred in Oak Hill Cemetery.

Sources

The Political Graveyard

External links

 

1828 births
1904 deaths
People from Towanda, Pennsylvania
Pennsylvania sheriffs
Democratic Party members of the United States House of Representatives from Pennsylvania
19th-century American politicians